The Lake Taupo Cycle Challenge is New Zealand's largest mass participation cycling event. First held in 1977, it takes place on the last Saturday of each November and circumnavigates Lake Taupo, a volcanic crater lake in the centre of the North Island. The ride starts and finishes in Taupo with one full circuit being approximately 160 km. Around 7,000 riders take part each year.

Categories 
The event aims to cater for all riders, from the elite racers to those just wishing to make it around. This is reflected in the range of finishing times - from under 4 to over 10 hours. Riders are asked to nominate finishing times and staggered starts are used to group riders by ability.

Subcategories of the event are (2022 data):
 Round The Lake: A one lap circuit of Lake Taupo, starting and finishing in Taupō and following Poihipi Road and State Highways 32, 41 and 1. Approximately 160 km.
 Length Of The Lake: One half of the full circuit, starting at Turangi and finishing in Taupō. Approximately 80 km.
Lakesider: A 16 km leisure ride for recreational cyclists, mostly off-road.  
 Enduro: An option for individuals who ride multiple laps of the lake circuit (normally either two, four or eight,  - this is certified as a qualifying brevet for Paris–Brest–Paris and RAAM). 
 Huka Mountain Bike: Mountain bike challenges of 35 km, 60 km or 85 km, and an 85 km elite licensed rider race.
 Men's Classic Road Race: An official BikeNZ sanctioned race. Participants set off before the rest of the riders, competing in a full-on race, with a current racing license required, and entry limited to 100 riders. Riders must have a previous best time in the main event of under 4:30. 
 Women's Classic Road Race: A women's only 100 km race for licensed riders from Taupo to Turangi and return.

Records
Source:
 Fastest Round the Lake (male): Sam Gaze 3:37 (2017 Men's Classic winner) 
 Fastest Round the Lake (female): Susy Pryde 3:57 (1999)

Past winners
Source:

References

External links 
 Lake Taupo Cycle Challenge (official event website)

Taupō District
Cycle racing in New Zealand
Sport in Taupō
Cycle races in New Zealand
Lake Taupō